XF5 may refer to:

Aviation 
Grumman XF5F Skyrocket, experimental twin-engined interceptor
IHI Corporation XF5. turbofan jet engine
Northrop F-5 (experimental designation XF5-A), supersonic light fighter
Vought XF5U "Flying Flapjack", experimental disc-winged fighter

Other uses 
The X Factor (British series 5), British TV series